Climb Up the Wall is a 1960 British comedy and musical film directed by Michael Winner and starring Jack Jackson, Glen Mason and Russ Conway. It features uncredited appearances by Peter Sellers and Harry Secombe.

Plot

Cast
 Jack Jackson as himself  
 Glen Mason as himself  
 Russ Conway as himself  
 Craig Douglas as himself  
 Mike Preston as himself  
 Cherry Wainer as herself  
 Libby Morris as herself  
 Malcolm Jackson as himself  
 Tommy Yeardye as himself  
 Don Storer as himself 
 Neville Taylor as himself  
 Aleta Morrison as herself  
 George 'Calypso' Browne as himself  
 Rahnee Motie as herself

References

Bibliography
 Chibnall, Steve & McFarlane, Brian. The British 'B' Film. Palgrave MacMillan, 2009.

External links

1960 films
British musical comedy films
1960 musical comedy films
1960s English-language films
Films directed by Michael Winner
Films with screenplays by Michael Winner
1960s British films